Lucille Proctor Nawara (born 1941) is an American landscape painter and printmaker. She was born in Oklahoma City, Oklahoma in 1941 and grew up in Massachusetts. She graduated from Smith College with a Bachelor of Arts degree in 1962. Nawara currently lives and works in Michigan.

Career 
Nawara taught studio art at Wayne State University and at the Cranbrook Academy of Art.

References

External links 
 Smith College Alumnae Oral History Project (PDF)
 Bash Bish Falls, Screenprint, 1989

1941 births
20th-century American painters
20th-century American printmakers
21st-century American painters
21st-century American printmakers
American women painters
American women printmakers
Living people
20th-century American women artists
21st-century American women artists